Tomi Pöllänen (born 26 May 1978 in Joensuu) is a Finnish former professional ice hockey forward.

Career

Early career
He started his career in 1993, playing for Jokipojat at junior level and was promoted to its Mestis-team in front of the 2000–01-season. The year after he got transferred to KooKoo in the same league, where he became the league's top scorer with 28 goals and made the All-Star team.

SM-liiga and Norway
In 2002, he joined Ässät in the SM-liiga for two seasons, before moving to Norway playing for Frisk Tigers in the 2004–05 season of GET-ligaen. He then moved back home to play for SM-liiga team KalPa in the 2005–06-season. After that he joined Jokipojat for 28 matches, following a brief spell at Sierre-Anniviers who played in the Swiss Nationalliga B.

Before the 2007–08 GET-ligaen season, Pöllanen made another trip to Norway, playing for GET-ligaen team Lillehammer, where he has played three seasons. In 2009–10, he was the player with the most points during the regular season.

References

External links

1978 births
Living people
Ässät players
Dresdner Eislöwen players
Finnish expatriate ice hockey players in Switzerland
Finnish expatriate ice hockey players in Norway
Finnish ice hockey forwards
Finnish expatriate ice hockey players in Sweden
Frisk Asker Ishockey players
HC Sierre players
KalPa players
Karlskrona HK players
KooKoo players
Jokipojat players
Lillehammer IK players
People from Joensuu
Sportspeople from North Karelia
Finnish expatriate ice hockey players in Germany